Villedieu-le-Château is a commune in the Loir-et-Cher department in central France.

Geography
Villedieu-le-Château borders the commune of La Chartre-sur-le-Loir (Sarthe) and marks the most eastern extension of the department and of the Bas-Vendômois. The Niclos stream traverses the commune.

Population

Sights
The village is dominated by the medieval fortified enceinte of a ruined medieval monastic foundation established by the Abbey of the Trinity at Vendôme. The cult of Our Lady of Pity was transferred to the 15th-century parish church, which possesses early painting on wood, and which is the site of an annual pilgrimage in September.

See also
Communes of the Loir-et-Cher department

References

Communes of Loir-et-Cher